Lircay may refer to:

Places
Lircay, Capital city of the Angaraes province of Peru
Lircay River, a small river near the city of Talca, in the Maule Region of Chile.

Historical events
Treaty of Lircay (May 14, 1814) - Cease fire treaty signed during the Chilean War of Independence
Battle of Lircay (April 17, 1830) - Final battle of the Chilean Civil War of 1829